Samuel Goldwyn Studio was the name that Samuel Goldwyn used to refer to the lot located on the corner of Formosa Avenue and Santa Monica Boulevard in West Hollywood, California, as well as the offices and stages that his company, Samuel Goldwyn Productions, rented there during the 1920s and 1930s. At various times, the location was also known as Pickford–Fairbanks Studios, the United Artists Studio, Warner Hollywood Studios, and its name since 1999, The Lot.

History
Originally controlled by independent producer Jesse D. Hampton, the site was acquired by Mary Pickford and Douglas Fairbanks and dubbed Pickford–Fairbanks Studios in 1919. It was later renamed the United Artists Studio in 1928, as it was being used by several independent producers, including Samuel Goldwyn, that distributed through United Artists. Although Goldwyn did not control the deed for the land, he and Joseph Schenck built many of the facilities on the lot.

Schenck left United Artists in 1935, leaving his share of the deed to Goldwyn, and Fairbanks died in 1939, leaving his share to Pickford. When Goldwyn left United Artists in 1940, he sought to rename the lot Samuel Goldwyn Studio. Pickford and Goldwyn fought over the name and ownership of the property until a court ordered that the lot be auctioned in 1955.

James Mulvey, Goldwyn's most trusted business confidant and president of Samuel Goldwyn Inc., outbid Pickford for the property. The lot officially became Samuel Goldwyn Studio and remained so until Warner Bros. purchased the site in 1980, naming it Warner Hollywood Studios.

Warner Bros. sold the property in 1999, and the name was officially changed to its longtime nickname, The Lot.

Awards
The sound department of the studio was awarded with the Academy Award for Best Sound for the film In the Heat of the Night (1967).

See also
 Formosa Cafe
 Goldwyn Pictures
 Metro-Goldwyn-Mayer
 United Artists
 Samuel Goldwyn Productions
 The Samuel Goldwyn Company
 Samuel Goldwyn Films
 Samuel Goldwyn Television

References

External links

Mass media companies established in 1919
Mary Pickford
American companies disestablished in 1999
1999 disestablishments in California
Defunct American film studios
Silent film studios
Best Sound Mixing Academy Award winners
American companies established in 1919
1919 establishments in California